Soveyseh District is a district (bakhsh) in Karun County, Khuzestan Province, Iran. The district has no cities.  The district has two rural districts (dehestan): Soveyseh Rural District and Muran Rural District. The district has a population of 16,616, in 3,131 families. The district was established on 23 January 2013.

References 

Districts of Khuzestan Province
Karun County
2013 establishments in Iran